Kim Yoon-kyung (born 13 January 1977) is a South Korean taekwondo practitioner. 

She won a gold medal in middleweight at the 1999 World Taekwondo Championships, and a gold medal at the 2000 Asian Taekwondo Championships.

References

External links

1977 births
Living people
South Korean female taekwondo practitioners
World Taekwondo Championships medalists
Asian Taekwondo Championships medalists